Astacosia lineata is a moth of the subfamily Arctiinae. It was described by Hervé de Toulgoët in 1965 and is endemic to Madagascar.

References

Moths described in 1966
Lithosiini
Moths of Madagascar
Moths of Africa